Delio "Maravilla" Gamboa Rentería (28 January 1936 – 23 August 2018) was a Colombian football player. Gamboa's career ran from 1955 to 1974 in which time he played for Atlético Nacional, Millonarios, Independiente Santa Fe, Once Caldas, and Deportes Tolima, "Maravilla" translates directly to "wonder".

In the beginning
Born in Buenaventura (Valle del Cauca), Colombia, Delio Gamboa signed with Atlético Nacional in 1958, after  getting noticed playing in a "aficionado" national league. A year later, Gamboa was transferred to a football club named CD Oro based out of Mexico. He was considered to be their most important player for two straight seasons. He led Oro to be runners-up of the Mexican Domestic league in his first season with the club.

Time with Colombia National Team
Delio took part in the 1961 Colombia National Squad which qualified for the following years FIFA World Cup. At the 1962 FIFA World Cup an injury limited Gamboa to just one appearance at said World Cup.

"Maravilla"
Upon his arrival in Colombia to play in the 1961 qualifiers Delio joined Millonarios. He went on to play for Millonarios from 1961–1965. He won the Colombian Domestic League (now the Liga Águila) title four straight seasons (1961, 1962, 1963 and 1964).
Delio had been given his nickname "Maravilla" when still an amateur, as number 10 (inside-left was the position called then) on the Valle del Cauca selección, which outclassed all other State teams and garnered the Colombian championship, stunning the spectators with his play which people thought nothing short of miraculous and Gamboa "a wonder" in the flesh. He briefly revived the nickname which Millonarios sides earned in the DiStefano-Pedernera era, "El Ballet Azul" ("The Blue Ballet") for its elegant and artistic style of play.

Copa Libertadores with "Millos" 

In the 1962 Edition "Maravilla" and "Los Embajadores" translating to "The Ambassadors" saw an early first round exit. In 1963 they were matched up with continental football giants of that era in Garrincha's Botafogo and Alianza de Lima from Peru. They faced no better fortunes as they again were eliminated. Despite being eliminated early "Maravilla" and "Millos" would come back and win the Domestic crown the following year. Though they had no title to show Millonarios led by Gamboa represented Colombia in the Copa Libertadores for four straight years and were thus nicknamed "Los Embajadores".

Stint at Santa Fe 

Although then came the injuries, at the end of the 1965 campaign "Maravilla" was sold to Independiente Santa Fe. Nonetheless "Maravilla" went on to win the Domestic title with Santa Fe in 1966. Gamboa scored 33 goals in 76 matches for Santa Fe between 1966 and 1968.

Later Years 

After the titles, "wonderful play" and the rash of injuries he spent the 1968–1970 seasons at Once Caldas and then transferred to Deportes Tolima for the 1971 and 1972 campaigns.
"Maravilla"'s career finally came full circle when he returned to the club that quite possibly saw his best form, Millonarios, in 1973 and ended he professional playing career in 1974.
He latter went on to be Head Coach for Deportes Tolima and then left to become the Director of Millonarios youth system.

Delio "Maravilla" Gamboa's innate skill led many to consider him the best Colombian footballer of the 1960s. Real Madrid scouted him but apparently his lanky, slight build deterred the European Millonarios from signing him. He was also widely admired for overcoming the economic and social discrimination and barriers imposed at that time, as well as the  discrimination and barriers he faced due to his skin's complexion, all of which were evident in Colombia in that era. Which may be just another reason why Delio Gamboa was considered a "Maravilla".

References

External links
https://web.archive.org/web/20120206013119/http://www.colombiaaprende.edu.co/html/etnias/1604/article-83236.html 
http://www.losmillonarios.net/leyendas_delio.php 
https://web.archive.org/web/20080304162234/http://www.lacoctelera.com/millonarios/post/2006/09/11/historia-del-club-deportivo-millonarios 

1936 births
2018 deaths
1962 FIFA World Cup players
1967 South American Championship players
Atlético Nacional footballers
Colombia international footballers
Colombian footballers
Colombian expatriate footballers
Deportes Tolima footballers
Independiente Santa Fe footballers
Millonarios F.C. players
Once Caldas footballers
Categoría Primera A players
Liga MX players
Expatriate footballers in Mexico
Association football forwards
People from Buenaventura, Valle del Cauca
Sportspeople from Valle del Cauca Department
Deportes Tolima managers